Sergio Díaz may refer to:

Sergio Díaz (footballer, born 1956), Argentine football forward
Sergio Díaz (footballer, born 1985), Spanish football defender
Sergio Díaz (footballer, born 1991), Spanish football defender
Sergio Díaz (footballer, born 1998), Paraguayan football forward
Sergio Díaz (sound editor) (born 1969), Mexican sound editor
Sergio Díaz-Granados Guida (born 1968), Colombian politician